Roosevelt Davis (November 19, 1904 – December 28, 1968) was an American Negro league pitcher from the 1920s to the 1940s.

A native of Bartlesville, Oklahoma, Davis made his Negro leagues debut with the St. Louis Stars in 1924. Known for his spitball and emery ball, he enjoyed a career that lasted over 20 years. Davis died in Chicago, Illinois in 1968 at age 64. His grave was marked by the Negro Leagues Baseball Grave Marker Project in 2005.

References

External links
 and Baseball-Reference Black Baseball stats and Seamheads

1904 births
1968 deaths
Chicago American Giants players
Cincinnati Clowns players
Cleveland Buckeyes players
Columbus Blue Birds players
Indianapolis ABCs (1931–1933) players
Kansas City Monarchs players
Memphis Red Sox players
New York Black Yankees players
Newark Eagles players
Pittsburgh Crawfords players
Pollock's Cuban Stars players
St. Louis Stars (baseball) players
20th-century African-American sportspeople
Baseball pitchers